Impact Plus (stylized as IMPACT! +Plus) is a video streaming service owned and operated by Anthem Wrestling Exhibitions, the parent company of professional wrestling promotion Impact Wrestling. The platform replaced the Global Wrestling Network and features services not previously available on GWN, notably live monthly premium events. The platform utilized the technology and ecosystem of Brightcove.

History
The first service to stream Total Nonstop Action Wrestling (TNA) content on-demand happened in 2009, when the company introduced its TNA Video Vault. The service changed its name to 'TNA On Demand' in 2010 and ran up until around early 2013. The company also launched the 'TNA Wrestling Plus' YouTube channel - where users could rent pay-per-views and documentaries previously released on DVD. In early 2017, Anthem launched the 'Total Access TNA' (later renamed 'Total Access Impact') originally for UK users after Challenge TV's TNA broadcasting contract had expired.

On October 10, 2017 Impact Wrestling launched Global Wrestling Network with 1,000 hours of content from the Impact Wrestling library. The service also includes content from the Fight Network, Border City Wrestling, Wrestling at the Chase and other sources.

On August 14, 2018 Jeff Jarrett and his company Global Force Entertainment announced that it had filed a lawsuit against Impact Wrestling's parent company Anthem Sports & Entertainment in the District Court of Tennessee for copyright infringement over the GFW rights, as Jarrett owned all Global Force Wrestling properties since its creation in 2014. If the lawsuit by Jarrett is successful, Impact would need to immediately suspend the operations of GWN.

On April 28, 2019, during its Rebellion pay-per-view, Impact announced the launching of Impact Plus which replaced Global Wrestling Network.

On August 30, 2019, Impact announced that an Impact Plus subscription package would be available on FITE TV.

Programming

TNA/Impact
All pay-per-view events
Select One Night Only events (All 2013–2015, 2017–present; 7 of 10 2016)
All Impact Plus Monthly Specials
All TNA weekly pay-per-views (aka the Asylum Years)
All episodes of TNA British Boot Camp
Select episodes of Impact! (All 2004–2010, 2017–present (except those which aired within 10 days); select 2011, 2015–2016)
Select episodes of Impact! Xplosion (All 2018, select 2016–2017)
Select episodes of TNA Legends
Select episodes of TNA Unfinished Business
Select episodes of TNA's Greatest Matches
Select episodes of TNA Epics
All episodes of Inside Impact
All Twitch Specials
Impact in 60
Classic Compilations  (TNA's home video releases)
Hidden Gems
All episodes of Outside the Ropes
All episodes of Calihan Uncensored
All episodes of Before the Impact
All episodes of Gut Check
All episodes of Impact! after shock
All episodes of TNA Reaction

Source:

Other

Classic wrestling
Pro Wrestling Superstars
Wrestling at the Chase

Indy wrestling
Capital Wrestling
International Pro Wrestling
WrestleCade
Superkick'd
AML Wrestling
Future Stars of Wrestling
WrestlePro
Rise Wrestling
PCW UK
Rocky Mountain Pro
Great White North Wrestling
Prestige Wrestling
Destiny World Wrestling
Border City Wrestling
Championship Wrestling From Hollywood
Championship Wrestling From Arizona
Alpha-1 Wrestling
Ultimate Championship Wrestling
World Series Wrestling
Smash Wrestling
Lariato Pro

Source:

References

External links 
 

Internet properties established in 2019
Internet television channels
Impact Wrestling
Subscription video streaming services
Professional wrestling streaming services
Anthem Sports & Entertainment